Bieżuń  is a town in Żuromin County, Masovian Voivodeship, Poland. The town lies on the Wkra River. As of December 2021, it has a population of 1,807.

History

Jędrzej of Golczew, castellan of Płock, established the town at the end of the 14th century. Duke Siemowit IV of Masovia granted the city rights charter in 1406 and in 1869, during Russia's occupation, the town lost its city rights until 1994. Bieżuń was a private town, administratively located in the Płock Voivodeship in the Greater Poland Province of the Polish Crown. Prior to the Deluge the town was famous and had a strong castle, but it was destroyed during that war. Polish Crown Chancellor Andrzej Zamoyski was born there and lived in the palace he built while working on his code of civil laws known as Zbiór praw sądowych. During Zamojski's residency there, in 1767, Polish–Lithuanian Commonwealth king Stanisław August Poniatowski granted the renewal of the town charter under the Magdeburg rights.

After the Third Partition of Poland the town fell into the Prussia's domain, then during the War of the Fourth Coalition there was a small pitched battle between the Napoleonic troops and the Prussians, known as the Battle of Bieżuń, a French victory that took place on December 21–23, 1806. Between 1807-15 it was part of the Polish Duchy of Warsaw, then under the Russian dominion until 1918, when Poland regained independence. During the Polish–Soviet War, the Soviets invaded the town on 22 August 1920, and then briefly occupied it. Following the joint German-Soviet invasion of Poland, which started World War II in September 1939, the town was occupied by Germany until 1945. In 1942, the occupiers expelled around 100 Poles from the town. Expelled Poles were initially held in a camp in Działdowo and then deported to the Kraków District of the General Government in German-occupied southern Poland, while their houses were handed over to German colonists as part of the Lebensraum policy.

Sports
The local football team is Wkra Bieżuń. It competes in the lower leagues.

Notable people
 Jerzy Bończak (born 1949), Polish actor

References

 Słownik geograficzny Królestwa Polskiego i innych krajów słowiańskich, Tom I, pages 224-225 
 Battle of Bieżuń

External links

 Official website 
 Jewish Community in Bieżuń on Virtual Shtetl

Cities and towns in Masovian Voivodeship
Żuromin County